Candy is an album by jazz trumpeter Lee Morgan released on the Blue Note label in 1958, featuring performances by Morgan, Sonny Clark, Doug Watkins and Art Taylor.

Reception
The Allmusic review by Stacia Proefrock awarded the album 4 stars, stating: "Not merely a technical marvel, his tone on this album was sweet and his playing fluid, infused with joy and crisply articulated emotion. Morgan would later turn out to be an expert songwriter, but here songs like Buddy Johnson's 'Since I Fell for You,' and Jimmy Heath's 'C.T.A.' gave him ample space to show off his talents."

Track listing 
 "Candy" (David, Kramer, Whitney) - 7:06
 "Since I Fell for You" (Johnson) - 5:39
 "C.T.A." (Heath) - 5:06
 "All the Way" (Cahn, Van Heusen) - 7:27
 "Who Do You Love, I Hope" (Berlin) - 5:01
 "Personality" (Burke, Van Heusen) - 6:16
 "All at Once You Love Her" (Hammerstein, Rodgers) - 5:26 Bonus track on CD reissue

Personnel 
 Lee Morgan - trumpet
 Sonny Clark - piano
 Doug Watkins - bass
 Art Taylor - drums

References 

Hard bop albums
Lee Morgan albums
1958 albums
Blue Note Records albums
Albums produced by Alfred Lion
Albums recorded at Van Gelder Studio